Jacques Landriault (September 23, 1921 – November 6, 2017) was a Canadian Prelate of Roman Catholic Church.

Landriault was born in Alfred, Ontario and was ordained a priest on February 9, 1947. Landriault was appointed bishop to the Diocese of Alexandria as well as titular bishop of Cadi on May 15, 1962 and consecrated on July 25, 1962. Landriault was appointed bishop of the Diocese of Hearst on May 27, 1964, installed July 14, 1964 and resigned from the post February 8, 1973. Landriault was appointed bishop of Diocese of Timmins on March 24, 1971 and resigned from the diocese on December 13, 1990. He died on November 6, 2017 at age 96.

External links
Catholic-Hierarchy
Alexandria Diocese
Diocese of Timmins
Diocese of Hearst

1921 births
2017 deaths
20th-century Roman Catholic bishops in Canada
21st-century Roman Catholic bishops in Canada
Participants in the Second Vatican Council
Roman Catholic bishops of Alexandria–Cornwall
Roman Catholic bishops of Hearst–Moosonee
Roman Catholic bishops of Timmins
Franco-Ontarian people